The 2014 Latvian First League started on 30 March 2014 and ended on 8 November 2014.

League table

External links 
 The First League on the Latvian Football Federation website
  League321.com - Latvian football league tables, records & statistics database. 

Latvian First League seasons
2
Latvia
Latvia